Mahatma Gandhi Road metro station may refer to:

 Mahatma Gandhi Road metro station (Bangalore)
 MG Road metro station (Delhi Metro)
 MG Bus Station metro station (Hyderabad Metro)
 M. G. Road metro station (Kochi Metro)
 Mahatma Gandhi Road metro station (Kolkata)